Chamaemyia is a genus of flies in the family Chamaemyiidae. It is the type genus of its family.

Species

References

External links 
 

Lauxanioidea genera
Chamaemyiidae
Taxa named by Johann Wilhelm Meigen